20,000 Men a Year (aka Air Story and Aviation Story) is a 1939 American action film directed by Alfred E. Green and written by Lou Breslow and Owen Francis. The film stars Randolph Scott, Preston Foster, Margaret Lindsay, Mary Healy, Robert Shaw, George Ernest, Jane Darwell, Kane Richmond and Maxie Rosenbloom. It was the fourth and last film produced by Cosmopolitan Pictures in its final year of operation.

Long before the attack on Pearl Harbor, the U.S. government had encouraged Hollywood to produce films designed to encourage a buildup of the aviation industry as well as the military. The release of 20,000 Men a Year on October 27, 1939 by 20th Century Fox reflected the spirit of the times.

Plot
Brad Reynolds is a respected pilot for Pacific Airlines. On a flight from Salt Lake City to Los Angeles, his aircraft hits a thick bank of fog. Reynolds and his co-pilot, Al Williams, are told by their dispatcher to re-route to Saugus, California, but Brad safely lands in Los Angeles, anyway. Jim Howell, the Southwestern representative for the Civil Aeronautics Authority (CAA), and Brad's old nemesis, suspends Brad for 60 days who angrily quits. Brad buys the Comet Airport in Riverdale, California. The airport mechanic Walt Dorgan is its only asset.

Ann Rogers tells Brad that her brother Skip, Brad's top student, is flying without his family's consent. Brad is forced to return Skip's deposit just when the bank is about to foreclose on the airport. Brad tries to return to Pacific Airlines to ask for his old job, but is told that he is too old.

Meanwhile, the CAA begins a Civilian Pilot Training Program at selected universities, with local airports being used. Unknown to Brad, Jim Howell convinces Riverdale banker Crandall to back Brad's airport, as nearby Western Institute of Technology is chosen. Brad becomes an instructor and begins selecting and training his students. Transferring to Western from Texas State is Tommy Howell, Jim's little brother.

Skip, unable to get his sister's permission to fly, becomes Tommy's roommate, and arranges a meeting between Brad and Ann. Skip is allowed to take a ground crew course. During flight training, Tommy admits to Brad that he is afraid to fly and does so only to please his older brother. Brad gives Tommy early morning lessons in secret.

Jim thinks that Brad is unfair to his brother, but during one of Tommy's secret lessons, the aircraft's oil line breaks. Brad is forced to knock him out in order to release his hands on the throttle.

Tommy, thinking the aircraft is crashing, parachutes out over a cavernous mountain range. Brad lands the aircraft safely and convinces a farmer to drive him back to the airport. He takes a second aircraft up to search for Tommy, with Skip joining him.

Tommy is found hanging by his parachute from a tree over a cliff, and when Brad climbs the tree to release Tommy, a branch breaks, throwing Brad to the ground. With both legs injured, Brad is now unable to fly. When the group does not return, Walt is forced to tell Dean Norris all.

Norris calls Jim, and a search begins. The next morning, however, Skip tells Brad he must fly the aircraft out himself if the two are to survive. Brad agrees, giving Skip strict instructions on how to fly the aircraft out of the canyon. Skip takes off, but knocks off his left landing gear, trying to clear a mountain top.

At Comet Airport, Jim and his boss, Gerald Grant, await word from the search parties. Seeing Skip try to land, Walt blocks the runway with his jeep until Jim can take another aircraft up to warn Skip and Brad about their damaged aircraft.

Learning about the problem, Brad instructs Skip how to execute a safe landing, even on only two wheels. On his second pass at the runway, Skip successfully lands the aircraft.

Later, Tommy, Skip and the others finish their pilot training, as Brad and Ann are now together, planning their own futures.

Cast     
  
 Randolph Scott as Brad Reynolds
 Preston Foster as Jim Howell
 Margaret Lindsay as Ann Rogers
 Mary Healy as Joan Marshall
 Robert Shaw as Tommy Howell
 George Ernest as Skip Rogers
 Jane Darwell as Mrs. Allen
 Kane Richmond as Al Williams
 Maxie Rosenbloom as Walt Dorgan 
 Douglas Wood as Crandall
 Sen Yung as Harold Chong
 Paul Stanton as Gerald Grant 
 Tom Seidel as Wally Richards 
 Edward Gargan as Dunk
 Harry Tyler as Joe Hungerford
 Sidney Miller as Irving Glassman
 Holmes Herbert as Dean Norris (uncredited)

Production
Based on a story by veteran pilot and screenwriter, Frank "Spud" Wead, 20,000 Men a Year was the first film to document the Civilian Pilot Training Program. The sequences on both the ground and in the air serve as a semi-documentary of the program.

The film was shot at various locations including, in Zion National Park, the Grand Canyon, Cedar City, Utah and at Occidental College, Los Angeles, as well as the Monrovia Airport in Monrovia, California. Principal photography for 20,000 Men a Year took place on location from August 26 to October 1938.

The aircraft used in 20,000 Men a Year were provided by stunt pilot Paul Mantz, who acted as the "air boss" and coordinated aerial photography. The aircraft included his Stearman C3 as a camera platform.

Reception
Film reviewer for The New York Times, Frank Nugent, described 20,000 Men a Year as "Never more than a sleeper jump behind the times, the screen has hurried around to the Roxy with a melodramatic salute to the aviation training program instituted not so long ago by the Civil Aeronautics Authority. '20,000 Men a Year', which is a statistical reference to the number of civil pilots the CAA hopes to be turning out ..."

References

Notes

Citations

Bibliography

 D'Arc, James V. When Hollywood Came to Town: A History of Moviemaking in Utah. Layton, Utah: Gibbs Smith, 2010. .
 Farmer, James H. Celluloid Wings: The Impact of Movies on Aviation. Blue Ridge Summit, Pennsylvania: Tab Books Inc., 1984. . 
 Paris, Michael. From the Wright Brothers to Top Gun: Aviation, Nationalism, and Popular Cinema. Manchester, UK: Manchester University Press, 1995. .
 Pendo, Stephen. Aviation in the Cinema. Lanham, Maryland: Scarecrow Press, 1985. .
 Wynne, H. Hugh. The Motion Picture Stunt Pilots and Hollywood's Classic Aviation Movies. Missoula, Montana: Pictorial Histories Publishing Co., 1987. .

External links
 
 
 
 dvd available

1939 films
American aviation films
20th Century Fox films
American action adventure films
1930s action adventure films
Films directed by Alfred E. Green
American black-and-white films
Films shot in Utah
Films scored by Samuel Kaylin
1930s English-language films
1930s American films